The 2007 Stan James World Matchplay was the 14th annual staging of the World Matchplay darts tournament by the Professional Darts Corporation. It was held at its traditional home, the Winter Gardens, Blackpool, between 22–28 July 2007. James Wade won his first major title, defeating Terry Jenkins 18–7 in the final.

Defending and eight times champion, Phil Taylor suffered a semi-final defeat to Jenkins, meaning that he had surrendered both the World Championship and World Matchplay titles for the first time since the PDC began in 1994. Raymond van Barneveld, who went into this event having won the first three Sky TV majors of the year (World Championship, UK Open and Las Vegas Desert Classic) saw his hopes of the clean-sweep evaporate with a quarter-final defeat to Adrian Lewis. Barneveld was making his debut in the event having failed to qualify in 2006.

Both Lewis and Jenkins suffered hangovers from their victories over the two favourites as they lost their next matches - with James Wade capitalising. He beat Lewis in the semi-final and Jenkins in the final. Wade became the youngest winner of a PDC televised title at the age of 24 and also rose to number three in the world rankings.

Prize fund

Qualification

PDC Top 16
  Phil Taylor (semi-finals)
  Raymond van Barneveld (quarter-finals)
  Colin Lloyd (first round)
  Peter Manley (first round)
  Terry Jenkins (runner-up)
  Dennis Priestley (second round)
  Adrian Lewis (semi-finals)
  Wayne Mardle (second round)
  Roland Scholten (quarter-finals)
  Andy Hamilton (second round)
  James Wade (winner)
  John Part (second round)
  Ronnie Baxter (quarter-finals)
  Andy Jenkins (second round)
  Barrie Bates (second round)
  Kevin Painter (second round)

PDPA Players Championship qualifiers
  Chris Mason (first round)
  Mark Dudbridge (first round)
  Mark Walsh (first round)
  Colin Osborne (first round)
  Denis Ovens (first round)
  Wayne Jones (first round)
  Alan Tabern (first round)
  Wes Newton (first round)
  Andy Smith (first round)
  Alan Warriner-Little (first round)
  Mick McGowan (first round)
  Mervyn King (quarter-finals)
  Michael van Gerwen (second round)
  Adrian Gray (first round)
  Steve Beaton (first round)
  Bob Anderson (first round)

Draw

Television coverage
Sky Sports broadcast the event live in the UK & Ireland for the 14th year running. The final between Wade & Jenkins achieved viewing figures of 183,000 - although that was surpassed by the quarter-finals on Thursday (188,000) and the semi-finals on Friday received the highest viewing figures with 240,000 (the third highest-rated programme on Sky Sports 1 for that week)

References

Planetdarts Netzone Results and reports from tournament

World Matchplay (darts)
World Matchplay Darts